Wassim Karoui (born 7 January 1997) is a Tunisian professional footballer who plays as a goalkeeper for Espérance de Tunis.

References

External links
 

1997 births
Living people
Footballers from Tunis
Tunisian footballers
Association football goalkeepers
Espérance Sportive de Tunis players